A watermark is an identifying image or pattern in paper that appears as various shades of lightness/darkness when viewed by transmitted light (or when viewed by reflected light, atop a dark background), caused by thickness or density variations in the paper.
Watermarks have been used on postage stamps, currency, and other government documents to discourage counterfeiting. There are two main ways of producing watermarks in paper; the dandy roll process, and the more complex cylinder mould process.

Watermarks vary greatly in their visibility; while some are obvious on casual inspection, others require some study to pick out. Various aids have been developed, such as watermark fluid that wets the paper without damaging it. 

A watermark is very useful in the examination of paper because it can be used for dating documents and artworks, identifying sizes, mill trademarks and locations, and determining the quality of a sheet of paper.

The word is also used for digital practices that share similarities with physical watermarks. In one case, overprint on computer-printed output may be used to identify output from an unlicensed trial version of a program. In another instance, identifying codes can be encoded as a digital watermark for a music, video, picture, or other file.

History 
The origin of the water part of a watermark can be found back when a watermark was something that only existed in paper.  At that time the watermark was created by changing the thickness of the paper and thereby creating a shadow/lightness in the watermarked paper. This was done while the paper was still wet/watery and therefore the mark created by this process is called a watermark.

Watermarks were first introduced in Fabriano, Italy, in 1282.

Processes

Dandy roll process 

Traditionally, a watermark was made by impressing a water-coated metal stamp onto the paper during manufacturing. The invention of the dandy roll in 1826 by John Marshall revolutionised the watermark process and made it easier for producers to watermark their paper.

The dandy roll is a light roller covered by material similar to window screen that is embossed with a pattern. Faint lines are made by laid wires that run parallel to the axis of the dandy roll, and the bold lines are made by chain wires that run around the circumference to secure the laid wires to the roll from the outside. Because the chain wires are located on the outside of the laid wires, they have a greater influence on the impression in the pulp, hence their bolder appearance than the laid wire lines.

This embossing is transferred to the pulp fibres, compressing and reducing their thickness in that area. Because the patterned portion of the page is thinner, it transmits more light through and therefore has a lighter appearance than the surrounding paper. If these lines are distinct and parallel, and/or there is a watermark, then the paper is termed laid paper. If the lines appear as a mesh or are indiscernible, and/or there is no watermark, then it is called wove paper. This method is called line drawing watermarks.

Cylinder mould process 
Another type of watermark is called the cylinder mould watermark. It is a shaded watermark first used in 1848 that incorporates tonal depth and creates a greyscale image. Instead of using a wire covering for the dandy roll, the shaded watermark is created by areas of relief on the roll's own surface. Once dry, the paper may then be rolled again to produce a watermark of even thickness but with varying density. The resulting watermark is generally much clearer and more detailed than those made by the Dandy Roll process, and as such Cylinder Mould Watermark Paper is the preferred type of watermarked paper for banknotes, passports, motor vehicle titles, and other documents where it is an important anti-counterfeiting measure.

On postage stamps 

In philately, the watermark is a key feature of a stamp, and often constitutes the difference between a common and a rare stamp.  Collectors who encounter two otherwise identical stamps with different watermarks consider each stamp to be a separate identifiable issue.  The "classic" stamp watermark is a small crown or other national symbol, appearing either once on each stamp or a continuous pattern. Watermarks were nearly universal on stamps in the 19th and early 20th centuries, but generally fell out of use and are not commonly used on modern U.S. issues, but some countries continue to use them.

Some types of embossing, such as that used to make the "cross on oval" design on early stamps of Switzerland, resemble a watermark in that the paper is thinner, but can be distinguished by having sharper edges than is usual for a normal watermark.  Stamp paper watermarks also show various designs, letters, numbers and pictorial elements.

The process of bringing out the stamp watermark is fairly simple.  Sometimes a watermark in stamp paper can be seen just by looking at the unprinted back side of a stamp.  More often, the collector must use a few basic items to get a good look at the watermark.  For example, watermark fluid may be applied to the back of a stamp to temporarily reveal the watermark.

Even using the simple watermarking method described, it can be difficult to distinguish some watermarks.  Watermarks on stamps printed in yellow and orange can be particularly difficult to see.  A few mechanical devices are also used by collectors to detect watermarks on stamps such as the Morley-Bright watermark detector and the more expensive Safe Signoscope.  Such devices can be very useful for they can be used without the application of watermark fluid and also allow the collector to look at the watermark for a longer period of time to more easily detect the watermark.

See also 
 Digital watermarking
 Thomas Harry Saunders
 Allan H. Stevenson
 Overprinting
 Overprint

References

Further reading
 Buxton, B.H. The Buxton Encyclopedia of Watermarks. Tappan, N.Y.: Buxton Stamp Co., 1977 114p.
 Felix, Ervin J. The Stamp Collector's Guidebook of Worldwide Watermarks and Perforations, from 1840 to date. Racine, WI.: Whitman Publishing Co., 1966 256p.
 Repeta, Louis E. Watermarks In Postage Stamp Paper: a comprehensive look at a key stamp element. Reprinted in 1999 from The American Philatelist (February 1987). 27p.

External links 

 WZMA - Watermarks of the Middle Ages
 Briquet online (in French)
 Piccard online (English)
 Watermark Database of the Dutch University Institute for Art History
 Bernstein - The Memory of Paper, Portal to 50 Watermark Databases
 Watermarks 1850-date
 Finding Watermarks on Stamps: Hobbizine article
 Thomas L. Gravell Watermark Archive
 Thomas Gravell watermark collection, Special Collections, University of Delaware Library, Newark, Delaware.
 Archive of Papers and Watermarks in Greek Manuscripts
 The History of Watermarks on U.S. Stamps 1895-1916  
 Watermark discussion list

Philatelic terminology
Money forgery
Papermaking

Stationery
Banknotes
Italian inventions

io:Filigrano